Leila Bolukat ( born 25 November 1980) is an Iranian actress. Her works include Yousuf e Payambar (2007), Amaliyate Mahde Koodak (2012) and Aseman Hamishe Abri Nist (2009), as well as Agha Yousef (2009), Zamani Baraye Asheghi (2012), and As O Pas (2016)

Filmography

Theatre

 2015 The Chant of Gabriel's Wing, Actor, Andisheh Hall, Director: Mohsen Moeini

The Chant of Gabriel's Wing is a treatise from Shahab al-Din Yahya ibn Habash Suhrawardi. This play is written by Mohsen Moeini and Adapted from Shahab al-Din Yahya ibn Habash Suhrawardi's book. The producer of this theater is Negin Mirhasani Vahed

References

External links
 
 

Iranian television actresses
Iranian film actresses
People from Tehran
Iranian actresses
Living people
1980 births